Ungmennafélagið Einherji is an Icelandic sports club, based in Vopnafjörður, Iceland.

The club is named after the einherjar, figures from Norse Mythology.

History 

The club was founded in Vopnafjörður on December 1, 1929, as Íþróttafélagið Einherjar. The first chairman was Ingólfur Erlendsson. The name of the club was changed to Ungmennafélagið Einherjar in 1943 and later to Ungmennafélagið Einherji.

In 1974 the club played in the Icelandic 3rd division (2. deild karla) for the first time. The team got promoted to the 2nd division (1. deild karla) for the first time in 1981. In the eighties the team played six seasons in the 2nd division reaching the club's record high; 5th place in 1986. By 1990 the club had been relegated down two divisions; to the fourth tier and hasn't seen promotion to the third tier since then.

In 2013, the club was promoted from the newly formed 4th division (4. deild karla) to the 3rd, by winning the division after a 2–0 victory in the final against Berserkir. This was Einherji's first title in the club's history.

Notable players
 Birkir Kristinsson
 Njáll Eiðsson
 Ólafur Jóhannesson
 Sigurður Donys Sigurðsson
 Bjarni Óskar Þorsteinsson
 David Hannah
 Ryan McCann

Chairmen

1929-193?: Ingólfur Erlendsson
193?-1938: Lorenz Karlsson
1938-1939: Guðni Sigurjónsson
1939-1940: Þorberg Jónsson
1940: Guðni Sigurjónsson
1940: Ragnar Pétursson
1940-1941: Sigurjón Jónsson
1941-1943: Kjartan Björnsson 
1943-1944: Sigurjón Þorbergsson
1944-1948: Pétur Nikulásson
1948-1952: Ásgrímur Halldórsson

1952-1953: Pétur Nikulásson
1953-1955: Sveinn Sigurðsson
1955-1956: Hreinn Sveinsson
1956-1957: Gunnar Jónsson
1957-19??: Halldór Karl Halldórsson
1960-196?: Pétur Nikulásson
1964/5-1969: Gísli Jónsson
1969-1973: Jón Andrésson
1973-1974: Hafþór Róbertsson
1974-1975: Sveinn Antoníusson

1975-1985: Aðalbjörn Björnsson
1985-1991: Ólafur K. Ármannsson
1991-2002: Einar Björn Kristbergsson
2002-2004: Svava Birna Stefánsdóttir
2004-2012: Einar Björn Kristbergsson
2013-2019: Magnús Már Þorvaldsson
2019: Linda Björk Stefánsdóttir
2019-2021: Víglundur Páll Einarsson
2021-2023: Bjartur Aðalbjörnsson
2023: Víglundur Páll Einarsson

Crest and colours

Crest
The club crest was designed in 1975 but until that time the club had no crest. The dragon in the crest is a reference to Snorri Sturluson's Heimskringla. One of the Landvættir of Iceland was the dragon guarding Vopnafjörður:

The crest is an orange dragon spitting fire. In front of the dragon is a dark green banner with the club's name written in orange letters.

Kit evolution
The club's colours have been orange and green since the early 1970s. The club's first kit was from the Icelandic kit and sportwear manufacturer Henson. This kit was composed of a light orange shirt with a green collar and green cuffs. The shorts were green but the socks orange.

Kit suppliers and shirt sponsors

Managers

 Gunnlaugur Dan Ólafsson (1974)
 Skarphéðinn Óskarsson (1975)
 Þórir Jónsson (1976)
 Sigurður Þorsteinsson (1977)
 Ingólfur Hannesson (1978)
 Þormóður Einarsson (1979)
 Einar Friðþjófsson (1980)
 Ólafur Jóhannesson (1981–1982)
 Gústaf Baldvinsson (1983)
 Hreiðar Sigtryggsson (1985)
 Snorri Rútsson (1985)
 Njáll Eiðsson (1986), (1988–1989), (1996)
 Aðalbjörn Björnsson (1987), (1991–1992), (1995)
 Örnólfur Oddsson (1990)
 Ólafur Ólafsson (1993)
 Eysteinn Kristinsson (1994)
 Sigurður Pálsson (1998)
 Hallgrímur Guðmundsson (1999)
 Helgi Már Þórðarson (2003–2004)
 Davíð Örvar Ólafsson (2009–2010)
 David Hannah (2011 – June, 2012)
 Ryan McCann (caretaker) (June 2012 – Aug 31, 2012)
 Víglundur Páll Einarsson (2013–2015), (2017)
 Yngvi Borgþórsson (2016)
 Jón Orri Ólafsson (2018), (caretaker July 13, 2021 - 2021)
 Akim Armstrong (2019)
 Ashley Civil (2020)
 Helgi Snær Agnarsson (2021 - July 6, 2021)
 Ingvi Ingólfsson (2022 -)

Seasons
{|class="wikitable"
|-bgcolor="#efefef"
! Season
! 
!Pos.
!Pl.
!W
!D
!L
!GS
!GA
!P
!Cup
!Notes
|-
|1974
|Third tier – 2. deild karla (Group G)
|4
|N/A
|N/A
|N/A
|N/A
|N/A
|N/A
|2
|Did not participate
|
|-
|1975
|Third tier – 2. deild karla (Group G)
|1
|5
|3
|0
|2
|14
|8
|8
|Did not participate
|4th in promotion playoff Group A
|-
|1976
|Third tier – 2. deild karla (Group F)
|3
|6
|N/A
|N/A
|N/A
|N/A
|N/A
|5
|First round
|
|-
|1977
|Third tier – 2. deild karla (Group F)
|2
|12
|N/A
|N/A
|N/A
|N/A
|N/A
|18
|Third round
|
|-
|1978
|Third tier – 2. deild karla (Group F)
|1
|10
|N/A
|N/A
|N/A
|N/A
|N/A
|17
|Quarter finals
|2nd in promotion playoff Group A
|-
|1979
|Third tier – 2. deild karla (Group F)
|1
|12
|8
|2
|1
|37
|13
|20
|Second round
|2nd in promotion playoff Group B
|-
|1980
|Third tier – 2. deild karla (Group F)
|1
|12
|N/A
|N/A
|N/A
|N/A
|N/A
|21
|Second round
|2nd in promotion playoff Group A
|-
|1981
|Third tier – 2. deild karla (Group F)
|1
|8
|7
|1
|0
|36
|7
|16
|First round
|bgcolor=#DDFFDD | 1st in promotion playoff Group B. 2nd in Championship playoffs. Promoted to 1. deild karla. 
|-
|1982
|Second tier – 1. deild karla
|7
|18
|6
|3
|9
|24
|31
|15
|Third round
|
|-
|1983
|Second tier – 1. deild karla
|8
|18
|5
|7
|6
|17
|21
|17
|Fourth round
|
|-
|1984
|Second tier – 1. deild karla
|10
|18
|1
|3
|14
|11
|35
|6
|Second round
|bgcolor=#FFCCCC | Relegated to 2. deild karla
|-
|1985
|Third tier – 2. deild karla (North-East Group)
|1
|16
|11
|3
|2
|35
|17
|36
|Fourth round
|bgcolor=#DDFFDD | 2nd in Championship playoffs. Promoted to 1. deild karla.
|-
|1986
|Second tier – 1. deild karla 
|5
|18
|9
|2
|7
|28
|24
|29
|Second round
|
|-
|1987
|Second tier – 1. deild karla 
|9
|18
|5
|4
|9
|21
|35
|19
|Third round
|bgcolor=#FFCCCC | Relegated to 2. deild karla
|-
|1988
|Third tier – 2. deild karla (North-East Group)
|1
|14
|10
|3
|1
|36
|11
|33
|Fourth round
|bgcolor=#DDFFDD | 2nd in Championship playoffs. Promoted to 1. deild karla.
|-
|1989
|Second tier – 1. deild karla
|10
|18
|4
|2
|12
|21
|51
|14
|First round
|bgcolor=#FFCCCC | Relegated to 2. deild karla
|-
|1990
|Third tier – 2. deild karla
|9
|18
|2
|4
|12
|27
|48
|10
|Third round
|bgcolor=#FFCCCC | Relegated to 3. deild karla
|-
|1991
|Fourth tier – 3. deild karla (Group E)
|2
|14
|8
|3
|3
|38
|24
|27
|Second round
|
|-
|1992
|Fourth tier – 3. deild karla (Group D)
|2
|18
|14
|2
|2
|52
|22
|44
|Second round
|
|-
|1993
|Fourth tier – 3. deild karla (Group D)
|3
|12
|7
|2
|3
|39
|16
|23
|Second round
|
|-
|1994
|Fourth tier – 3. deild karla (Group D)
|5
|12
|4
|2
|6
|34
|34
|14
|Third round
|
|-
|1995
|Fourth tier – 3. deild karla (Group D)
|4
|12
|4
|2
|6
|14
|19
|14
|First round
|
|-
|1996
|Fourth tier – 3. deild karla (Group D)
|3
|12
|3
|2
|7
|23
|30
|11
|First round
|
|-
|1997
|Non-League
|N/A
|N/A
|N/A
|N/A
|N/A
|N/A
|N/A
|N/A
|Did not participate
|
|-
|1998
|Fourth tier – 3. deild karla (Group E)
|5
|12
|2
|1
|9
|26
|44
|7
|First round
|
|-
|1999
|Fourth tier – 3. deild karla (Group E)
|4
|12
|1
|0
|11
|7
|34
|3
|First round
|
|-
|2000
|Non-League
|N/A
|N/A
|N/A
|N/A
|N/A
|N/A
|N/A
|N/A
|Did not participate
|
|-
|2001
|Non-League
|N/A
|N/A
|N/A
|N/A
|N/A
|N/A
|N/A
|N/A
|Did not participate
|
|-
|2002
|Non-League
|N/A
|N/A
|N/A
|N/A
|N/A
|N/A
|N/A
|N/A
|Did not participate
|
|-
|2003
|Fourth tier – 3. deild karla (Group D)
|5
|15
|5
|1
|9
|24
|36
|16
|First round
|
|-
|2004
|Fourth tier – 3. deild karla (Group D)
|3
|12
|7
|1
|4
|20
|15
|22
|First round
|
|-
|2005
|Non-League
|N/A
|N/A
|N/A
|N/A
|N/A
|N/A
|N/A
|N/A
|Did not participate
|
|-
|2006
|Non-League
|N/A
|N/A
|N/A
|N/A
|N/A
|N/A
|N/A
|N/A
|Did not participate
|
|-
|2007
|Non-League
|N/A
|N/A
|N/A
|N/A
|N/A
|N/A
|N/A
|N/A
|Did not participate
|
|-
|2008
|Non-League
|N/A
|N/A
|N/A
|N/A
|N/A
|N/A
|N/A
|N/A
|Did not participate
|
|-
|2009
|Fourth tier – 3. deild karla (Group D)
|4
|15
|5
|5
|5
|33
|34
|20
|Third round
|
|-
|2010
|Fourth tier – 3. deild karla (Group D)
|4
|12
|6
|1
|5
|30
|26
|19
|First round
|
|-
|2011
|Fourth tier – 3. deild karla (Group D)
|4
|12
|3
|6
|3
|17
|23
|15
|Did not participate
|
|-
|2012
|Fourth tier – 3. deild karla (Group D)
|4
|14
|7
|2
|5
|32
|20
|23
|Did not participate
|bgcolor=#FFCCCC | Relegated to 4. deild karla
|-
|2013
|Fifth tier – 4. deild karla (Group C)
|1
|14
|11
|1
|2
|59
|14
|34
|Second round
|bgcolor=#DDFFDD | Champions after promotion playoffs. Promoted to 3. deild karla
|-
|2014
|Fourth tier – 3. deild karla
|8
|18
|5
|5
|8
|24
|33
|20
|First round
|
|-
|2015
|Fourth tier – 3. deild karla
|4
|18
|8
|5
|5
|36
|35
|29
|First round
|
|-
|2016
|Fourth tier – 3. deild karla
|3
|18
|9
|2
|7
|38
|30
|29
|First round
|
|-
|2017
|Fourth tier – 3. deild karla
|6
|18
|7
|4
|7
|27
|25
|25
|First round
|
|-
|2018
|Fourth tier – 3. deild karla
|6
|18
|9
|1
|8
|33
|32
|28
|Third round
|
|-
|2019
|Fourth tier – 3. deild karla
|7
|22
|6
|6
|10
|27
|35
|24
|First round
|
|-
|2020*
|Fourth tier – 3. deild karla
|9
|20
|7
|2
|11
|39
|53
|23
|First round
|*Rest of the season cancelled due to COVID-19
|
|-
|2021
|Fourth tier – 3. deild karla
|11
|22
|6
|2
|14
|36
|51
|20
|First round
|bgcolor=#FFCCCC | Relegated to 4. deild karla
|
|-
|2022
|Fifth tier – 4. deild karla (Group E)
|1
|15
|14
|1
|0
|73
|12
|43
|Second round
|bgcolor=#DDFFDD | Champions after promotion playoffs. Promoted to 3. deild karla
|-
|}

Current squad 
As of 13 July 2021

Player records

Most league appearances
{|class="wikitable"
|-bgcolor="#efefef"
! 
! Name
! Years
! Seasons
! Total appearances
|-
| 1
| Kristján Davíðsson
|1976-1995
|20
|278
|-
| 2
| Aðalbjörn Björnsson
|1974-1998
|24
|251
|-
|}

Most league goals
As of October 19th 2020

Statistics are missing from 1974-1981
{|class="wikitable"
|-bgcolor="#efefef"
! 
! Name
! Years
! Seasons
! Total goals
|-
| 1
| Sigurður Donys Sigurðsson
|2003, 2009, 2012–2020
|10
|85
|-
| 2
| Todor Hristov
|2015-2020
|6
|69
|-
| 3
| Hallgrímur Guðmundsson
|1985-1999
|N/A
|67
|-
| 4
| Gunnlaugur Bjarnar Baldursson
|2009–2018
|10
|50
|-
| 5
| Kristján Davíðsson
|1976-1995
|20
|40 (From 1981)

|}

References 

 
Football clubs in Iceland
1929 establishments in Iceland